Dil Bhi Tera Hum Bhi Tere is a 1960 Hindi movie. Produced by Bihari Masand for Kanwar Kala Mandir, the film is directed by Arjun Hingorani. The film stars Balraj Sahni, Dharmendra and Kum Kum. The film was Dharmendra's debut film.

Plot
Panchu Kumtekar lives a near-destitute lifestyle in Bombay along with his school-going brother, Shiri. He makes a living as a con-man, gambling and picking pockets with the assistance of another poverty-stricken male, Choti. He has a friend in Ashok who sells Cavendar cigarettes on busy streets by wearing stilts. One day, Ashok meets a maidservant, Sonu Mangeshkar, and they fall in love. Shiri is unable to pay his fees, and is expelled from school, but a local prostitute, Prema, comes to his assistance, much to the initial displeasure of Panchu. But he changes his mind eventually and accepts her help. In time, they fall in love and get married. Ashok is then employed as a boxer by Sonu's employer, starts earning enough money to support them all, and even moves into a three bedroom apartment, while Panchu decides to become honest and finds work as a peon. Then their lives are shattered when Sonu's Goa-based dad falls ill and she goes to visit him via a ship, which sinks, killing everyone on board. Ashok, depressed and devastated, decides not to box anymore. Panchu decides to revert to stealing. He unknowingly extorts money from the mother of Police Inspector Moti, is subsequently arrested, and jailed. Prema gets run over by a horse-carriage, and Shiri takes to selling candy on trains, tries to escape from a ticket-checker, and falls off a running train. Will Prema and Shiri recover? And, if yes, will their lifestyle ever improve?

Cast
 Balraj Sahni... Panchu Dada
 Dharmendra... Ashok (credited as Dharmender)
 Kumkum... Sonu Mangeshkar
 Usha Kiran... Prema
 Sushil
 Mohan Choti... Choti
 Hari Shivdasani... Memsaab's Father
 Ishu Jagirdar as a Mahdu
 Draz
 Ishu
 Tun Tun... Moti's Mother
 Bajaj
 Ranvir Raj... Police Inspector Moti
 Khusal
 Jankidas ... Jankidas - Teacher
 Baby Shobha... Shobha Jayant - Child Artist
 Kesari
 Fazlu
 Nazir Kashmiri
 Reddy
 Anoop... Shree Kumthekar - child artist

Soundtrack

References

External links 
 

1960 films
1960s Hindi-language films
Films scored by Kalyanji Anandji